Marquis Franklin "Bill" Horr (May 2, 1880 – July 1, 1955) was an American football player, coach, and Olympic track and field athlete.

He played college football as a tackle at Syracuse University and was selected as an All-American in 1908. At Syracuse, Horr also competed in track and field. At the 1908 Summer Olympics in London, he won a silver medal in the Greek Style discus throw and a bronze in the freestyle discus throw. Horr served as the head football coach at Northwestern University in 1909 and at Purdue University from 1910 to 1912, compiling a career record of 9–14–2.

Head coaching record

References

External links
 Syracuse football profile
 
 

1880 births
1955 deaths
American male discus throwers
American football tackles
Northwestern Wildcats football coaches
Purdue Boilermakers football coaches
Syracuse Orange football coaches
Syracuse Orange football players
Syracuse Orange men's track and field athletes
All-American college football players
Athletes (track and field) at the 1908 Summer Olympics
Tug of war competitors at the 1908 Summer Olympics
Medalists at the 1908 Summer Olympics
Olympic bronze medalists for the United States in track and field
Olympic silver medalists for the United States in track and field
People from Stockbridge, New York
Players of American football from New York (state)